Buried in Violence is the first studio album by American thrash metal/groove metal band Product of Hate, released through Napalm Records on February 5, 2016.

Track listing

Charts
Buried in Violence debuted at number 9 on the Billboard Heatseekers East North Central Chart.

References

2016 debut albums
Napalm Records albums